Pseudatemelia subochreella, the straw-coloured tubic, is a species of gelechioid moth.

Taxonomy
Here, it is placed within the subfamily Amphisbatinae of the concealer moth family (Oecophoridae). The Amphisbatinae have alternatively been merged into the Oecophorinae, raised to full family rank, or placed as a subgroup of the Depressariinae (or Depressariidae if ranked as family).  

Recent research has shown that the genus Pseudatemelia is one of those close to Lypusa, the type of the supposed Tineoidea family Lypusidae. 
The genus Pseudatemelia has to be dissolved and all the species previously assigned to it has to be transferred to the genus Agnoea. Consequently this species should be assigned to the genus Agnoea, Lypusidae family, Gelechioidea superfamily.

Distribution and habitat
This species is present  in Europe, where it inhabits woodlands. At the periphery of its European range, it is not common; in the UK for example it is only found locally in southern England. It can also be found in the Near East and in North Africa.

Description
Pseudatemelia subochreella has a wingspan of  about 17–20 mm. This moth is not conspicuously colored, even by the standards of its rather drab genus, being a ruddy ochraceous brown overall (hence the name subochreella), or more yellow-grey with darker hindwings. All wings are unmarked.

Biology
The adults fly from May to July depending on the location; they are mainly nocturnal but are sometimes encountered flying around during the day. Its caterpillars live inside a self-made case built from a folded piece of leaf, that is often attached to tree trunks or stones.  They eat dead and decaying leaves and similar plant remains, and probably also rotting wood.

References

Amphisbatinae
Moths of Europe
Moths described in 1859